SS Aden was a British passenger screw-steamship launched on 5 October 1891 and completed by Sir Raylton Dixon and Co. in Middlesborough in 1892. She was 366 feet in length, 46.1 feet in breadth, while her tonnage was 3,925.0 gross tonnage. The Aden was powered by one triple expansion direct acting vertical engine of 2,050 hp. She was owned by the Peninsular and Oriental Steam Navigation Company (P&O) and was the second of three ships to be so named. She was lost at sea on 9 June 1897 with the loss of much life off the east coast of Socotra while carrying passengers from Colombo in Sri Lanka to London.

She was the second P&O liner to be called Aden. The first SS Aden was built in 1856 as a passenger steamer, in 1869 carrying some of the official guests from Marseilles to Port Said for the inauguration ceremonies of the Suez Canal. In 1872 she was sold to new owners in Shanghai. The third Aden was completed in 1946 and served worldwide in the tramp liner trade. She was scrapped in 1967.

In 1897 the second Aden was commanded by Captain R. E. L. Hill, who had served with P&O for seventeen years. The ship had a crew of 83, with 60 of these being native lascar seamen from India. The Aden had three lifeboats and three other boats, all of which could hold 276 people, together with all the required safety equipment of the time. She left Colombo on 2 June 1897 with 34 passengers, 14 of whom were children and three native nurses. Among the passengers were a number of female missionaries returning from their work in China. She sank with the loss of 78 lives mostly as a result of those who were washed over the side or left in lifeboats before a passing ship rescued them.

The wrecking of the Aden (1897)

At 3 a.m. on June 9, 1897, while steaming from Colombo in Sri Lanka to London, after several days of heavy monsoon weather the vessel struck the reef Rus Radressa, off the eastern coast of the island of Socotra. The engine-room was instantly flooded, and, in consequence, utter darkness ensued, causing a panic among some of the passengers, who, terror-stricken, rushed from their cabins to the upper deck in their night clothes. Some of the women and children were screaming while the men were silent, but filled with horror at the scene which met their gaze. Officers and crew were doing their utmost for the safety of the vessel, during which many showed great courage.

A desperate situation
It soon became clear that the Aden was sinking and the decision was taken to prepare to launch the ship's lifeboats on the starboard side (those on the port side - the weather side - had been washed away) and at the same time life-belts were issued. Meanwhile, distress signals were being made in the hope that they would be observed by some passing vessel. The boats were prepared for launching, and while this was being done, other members of the crew assisted the terror-stricken passengers to secure some more clothing from their cabins, as, when the first-alarm had been raised they had rushed on to the deck in their nightclothes, but when it was realised that some hours probably would elapse before it would be possible to launch a boat, and that in the meantime there was a possibility of the storm abating, they were pleased to accept the assistance of members of the crew in obtaining more suitable clothing.

Disasters to the lifeboats
The first lifeboat was lowered, only to be immediately swept away with three lascar crew members in it together with the first officer, Mr. Carden, who had seized a line and jumped overboard with it in an attempt to recover the boat. Neither the boat or the crew were seen again. The second officer, Mr. Miller, was immediately despatched in the cutter to rescue them, but this too was swept away by the now raging sea and lost. Only one lifeboat now remained which was also lowered but on reaching the violent sea this half-capsized, the sailors and stores it contained being thrown into the sea. Eventually, however, the crew managed to right it, and women and children were lowered into it, with the exception of five women, three of whom had decided to remain onboard with their husbands. The lifeboat left the ship in a tremendous sea and drifted rapidly out of sight. It and the passengers it held were never seen again. 

Among those passengers lost in the lifeboats were the missionaries Mrs. Gertrude Eliza Smyth (1856-1897), the wife of Dr. Richard Smyth, medical missionary at Ningpo, and Mrs. Collins, the widow of the Rev. J. S. Collins, of the Foochow Mission.

Washed overboard

As the storm continued to rage over the ship, one by one men, women, and children - too weak to withstand the repeated buffetings of the strong waves - were washed overboard. Of the 17 passengers now remaining on board, eight were swept overboard. These included Mr. Strain, from Tientsin, together with his wife and their two children; Miss Lloyd and Miss Weller, two missionaries from Foochow; and the baby of Mr. and Mrs. Pearce, together with its
Chinese nurse, who were among the first to be lost. Captain Hill, who had sustained a broken leg, was similarly washed over the side, as were several members of the native crew. Eventually, giving up hope of rescue for that day, the survivors retreated to the comparative safety of a cabin on a lower deck.

By the morning of 10 June the storm had slightly calmed, and those who were still mobile began a search for provisions, which was not without risk, for great waves were still sweeping over the stranded vessel. The fourth engineer, while trying to obtain water from the vicinity of the poop, was struck senseless by a heavy swell and was in danger of being swept over the side but was dragged to safety. Artificial respiration was used on him but it was five hours before he regained consciousness. Mr. Pearce, one of the passengers, also had a very narrow escape, and was only saved from being washed overboard by the prompt action of his wife. Eventually, a little food was found and was shared out.

Rescue

During all this a look-out was kept from aloft by desperate crewmen, but it was not until June 13 before the first vessel was sighted, the Logician. The distress signals from the Aden were unnoticed, however, and the ship passed by. On 17 June a second vessel, the Volute, was sighted, and again another, the Coromandel, on 20 June, but neither of them paid the slightest notice to the signals. The captains of both later testified that they believed the Aden had been abandoned. Finally, on the evening of 25 June, two steamers were sighted, one passing by and the other anchored under Socotra Island. A crewman from the Aden climbed the rigging while making signals, while lit candles were placed in the portholes. At daybreak on 26 June the steamer, the RIMS Mayo of the Royal Indian Marine, rounded the point and headed towards the wreck, anchoring within a mile of it. Although the sea was still violent the wind had calmed slightly, and it was with feelings of joy that the survivors on the Aden saw the lifeboat being lowered. It took the boat, manned by Lieutenants Dobbin (who had been on board the RIMS Warren Hastings when it was wrecked on 14 January 1897) and Goldsmith, 45 minutes to reach the wreck. In two trips all the surviving passengers and crew were taken aboard the Mayo, from which they safely disembarked at Aden harbour on 28 June.

References

1891 ships
Ocean liners of the United Kingdom
Ships built in England
Ships of P&O (company)
Steamships of the United Kingdom
Shipwrecks in the Indian Ocean
Maritime incidents in 1897